The Type 202 submarine was a short lived class of German submarines. Design of these very small submarines started in 1957 by Ingenieurkontor Lübeck (IKL). It was intended to build 40 Type 202 mini submarines with a six-man crew but technical difficulties and doubts about their usefulness reduced them to three, and of those three for trials, to be further reduced to two. The boats were in service only a few months and were scrapped shortly after.

They were one of the few military U-boats not bearing "U-numbers", probably since they were never intended for combat use. Instead they were named after important German engineers in submarine constructions  (like Wilhelm Bauer).

Hans Techel was built with traditional propeller and rudders (similar to the Type 205 submarines), but Friedrich Schürer had a rotatable Kort nozzle instead.

List of ships

References

 Die U-Boote der Marine seit 1955 - Spiegel online (in German)
 Die deutsche U-Boot Waffe - www.die-marine.de
 Klasse 202 oecd.de